Dr. Nikola Dekleva (19 December 1926, Leskovac – 31 December 2003, Dobrota near Kotor) was a Serbian surgeon, professor of medicine, creator of hiperbaric medicine in Serbia, and a recognized expert inside and outside the borders of Yugoslavia. He was also the founder and director of the Center for Hyperbaric Medicine at the Clinical Center "Zemun", in 1974.

Early life and education
Nikola Dekleva came from a medical family. His father Dusan Dekleva was a famous physician and surgeon, and at the time of Nikola's birth, he was the head of Surgery Department of the Hospital in Leskovac.

Nikola Dekleva graduated from School of Medicine in Belgrade, and then specialized in surgery.

References

 https://web.archive.org/web/20131012030051/http://web.arhiv.rs/Develop/Glasonose.nsf/e1e8ae1838fef875c1257298004aa01d/f0452c64d2419aadc12571d5004d5e87?OpenDocument

 

People from Leskovac
1926 births
2003 deaths